Black Flower is Taiwanese novel by Yu Wo and illustrated by Monto C3. It was published in 2009. It has writing in a different style from another series of Yu Wo. It is rather heavy and has many cruxes. Black Flower is a dark fantasy. It has wrath, love, hate, affiliation and revenge. Written in the first person, the story takes place in a fantasy world with many races. The novel details the story of the flower, black flower that has shapes like a human. It was born from the tree of souls, near the death tree. So, the black flower has to depart and it is the start of this story.

Plot

Everything was born and had means in itself. Don’t have anything worthless or live from day to day for comeback to death again. So, all life tries to search for the meaning of life such as Malance. The black flower that was last flower of the tree of souls has been born and does not know why when mission which first set became to empty. This story about journey of black flower starts

Main characters

Malance/Gumusmall: a flower who is guardian of tribal leaf. Another guardian has color but he has black color.  He has black hair and red eyes. He can control vine. Later he changes his name to Gumusmall because of something.

Onn Paladeen: a man and warrior. He is tall. And he helps Malance after the tree of soul had died.

Mira: a beautiful woman. She is kind and cares for Malance after the tree of soul died.

Casee Tandic/Lefteye: a friend of Malance. One day there was an unexpected situation that made him angry with Malance. He then sought revenge against Malance.

Taiwanese novels
2009 fantasy novels